Argelia is Spanish for Algeria. It may also refer to:

Places
Argelia, Antioquia, a town in Colombia
Argelia, Cauca, a town in Colombia
Argelia, Valle del Cauca, a town in Colombia

People
Argelia Velez-Rodriguez (born 1936), Cuban-American mathematician and educator
María Argelia Vizcaíno (born 1955), Cuban writer and activist

See also
Argelita, a municipality in Valencia, Spain